Chaleh Siah may refer to:
 Chaleh Siah, Ilam
 Chaleh Siah, Kermanshah
 Chaleh Siah, Mazandaran

See also
 Chal Siah (disambiguation)